The Puerta del Sol is a public square in Madrid, Spain.

Puerta del Sol may also refer to:

 Puerta del Sol, Toledo, a city gateway
 La Puerta del Sol, a sculpture in Chihuahua City, Mexico
 Gate of the Sun, a monolith in Tiahuanaco, Bolivia
 Puerto del Sol, a non-profit magazine from the New Mexico State University